Telkapalli or Telkapalle is a mandal in Nagarkurnool district in the state of Telangana, India.

Geography
It has an average elevation of 425 metres (1397 ft).

Institutions
 Siddhartha Vidyalayam
 Chaitanya Bharati Model School
 C. Laxma Reddy Cooperative Junior College
 Govardhan Reddy Junior College
 Vijaya Bank
 APGVB Telkapally, Peddur
 State Bank of India
 K.K Reddy school
 Shanthinikethan school

Business
Animal trade fair. Especially cows and Buffaloes.
Sri Rama Iron and Hardware, Telkapally

Villages
The villages in Telkapalle mandal are

 Alair
 Ananthasagar
 Boppally
 Chinamuddunur
 Daspally
 Gaddampally
 Gatturavipakula
Gattunellikuduru
 Golagundam
 Gouraram
 Kammareddypally
 Goureddypally 	
 Gouthampally 	

 Karvanga 	
 Laknaram 	
 Nadigadda 	
 Peddapally
 Peddur
 Rakonda 	
 Tallapally 	
 Vattipally 	
 Zamistapur

References

Mandals in Nagarkurnool district